Trias may refer to:
 Triassic, a geologic period
 Germanic Trias, a sequence of rock strata
 Bulbophyllum sect. Trias, a section in the genus of orchids Bulbophyllum
 Trias (game), a dinosaur-themed board game

People
 Robert Trias (1923–1989), American karate pioneer
 Xavier Trias (Xavier Trias i Vidal de Llobatera, born 1946), Spanish politician
 Mariano Trías (1868–1914), Filipino politician
 Jordi Trias (born 1980), a Spanish professional basketball player 
 Jasmine Trias (born 1986), a Filipino-American singer-entertainer

See also

General Trias, a city in the Philippines
Trias politica, about state organisation
Tria (disambiguation)
Triad (disambiguation)
Triplet (disambiguation)
Troika (disambiguation)
3 (disambiguation)